Spera is a frazione of the comune (municipality) of Castel Ivano,  Trentino, in the northern Italian region Trentino-Alto Adige/Südtirol, located about  east of Trento.  It was an independent commune until 1 January 2016.

Frazioni of Trentino-Alto Adige/Südtirol